Nature Bears a Vacuum is a 7" EP released by indie rock band The Shins. The EP was released on the Omnibus Records label in 1998. According to one reviewer, the EP is meant to be played at a different speed (33 rpm and 45 rpm) on each side.  The title is a reversal of the phrase "Nature abhors a vacuum".

Track listing
"Those Bold City Girls" – 2:04
"Eating Styes from Elephants' Eyes" – 1:41
"We Built a Raft and We Floated" – 2:02
"My Seventh Rib" – 2:37

References

1998 debut EPs
The Shins albums